Motiejus Kazimieras Valančius (also known by his pen-name Joteika and Ksiądz Maciek; 1801–1875) was a Catholic Bishop of Samogitia, historian and one of the best known Lithuanian/Samogitian writers of the 19th century.

Biography
Motiejus Valančius was born February 28, 1801, into a well-to-do peasant family in  village, Kretinga district. Early in his youth, he had his baptismal records altered to indicate noble birth; the family name was Polonized to Wołonczewski. This practice, not uncommon among prosperous villagers, was a means of providing educational opportunities otherwise denied to peasant children. In 1816 he entered the Dominican school at Žemaičių Kalvarija and six years later began his studies at the Theological Seminary in Varniai. He transferred to the Vilnius Priest Seminary in 1824, from which he graduated in 1828. Ordained a priest that same year, he spent the next six years teaching religion in Belarus. In 1834 he returned to Lithuania to take up a teaching position at the Kražiai College.

In 1840 he was assigned to the Vilnius Theological Seminary, where he lectured in pastoral theology and biblical archaeology and where he earned his doctorate in theology in 1842. That same year on orders of the Tsar, the Academy, its teaching staff and student body, was moved to St. Petersburg, Russia. Valančius came back to Lithuania because of health problems in 1845 and was appointed rector of the Varniai Priest Seminary, serving in this capacity until 1850. Having been absent from Lithuania during the anti-Russian uprising in 1831, Valančius was considered to be relatively apolitical, and thus the Russian government did not object when he was proposed as an Episcopal candidate for the see of Samogitia.

Bishop 

He was consecrated bishop in 1850, the first peasant to head over that diocese. Taking up his duties, he guided the diocese for the next 25 years, years of religious, political and social change not only within Samogitia but in Lithuania as a whole. He expanded and improved the Samogitian parochial school network, wrote many religious books, and in 1858 inaugurated a temperance movement, which grew to encompass nearly a million members, almost half of the county’s population. He also wrote the first Lithuanian language history of the Samogitian diocese, which has not lost its scientific value even nowadays.

His pastoral and educational work was interrupted by the uprising of 1863–1864 and was made extremely difficult as the Russian government tightened its reins after the revolt's defeat. Yet these circumstances did not prevent him from following a course that brought him into direct conflict with the authorities. He made every effort to undermine the government’s scheme of Russification. In 1874 Valančius fell ill and died in Kaunas on May 29, 1875. He was interred in the crypt of the Kaunas Cathedral Basilica.

Legacy

His services to the Lithuanian cause were lasting and important, including his opposition to the Russian government and the tactics he employed in resisting its policies, particularly the Lithuanian press ban. He sponsored the illegal practice of printing Lithuanian books in East Prussia and smuggling them into Lithuania by knygnešiai, which served to stimulate the emergence of the Lithuanian national movement. As an educator, able Church administrator, historian and ethnographer, and talented writer, Valančius is one of the most versatile and influential figures in 19th century Lithuania.

He left behind a number of written in Polish manuscripts of a memoir and diary nature:

 Rozmaite wiadomości zebrane przez ks. Macieja Wołonczewskiego (1839–1843)
 Rozmaite wiadomości zebrane (1843–1857)
 Rozmaite wiadomości (1858–1859)
 Diariusz zdrowia mego (1856–1871)
 Pamiętnik domowy (1858?–1873)
 Wiadomości o czynnościach pasterskich biskupa Macieja Wołonczewskiego (1850–1875)

These notes were not intended for publication by the author. However, they were published in the original Polish and Lithuanian translation in 2003 by Lithuanian historian Aldona Prašmantáitė. They are an important source for learning about the situation of the Catholic Church in Samogitia under Russian rule, as well as for learning about the Polish language of the region.

References

Sources

External links
 

1801 births
1875 deaths
19th-century Lithuanian historians
19th-century Roman Catholic bishops in the Russian Empire
Lithuanian Roman Catholic bishops
Lithuanian book smugglers
Polish diarists
Lithuanian writers in Polish
People from Kretinga District Municipality
People from Lithuania Governorate
Recipients of the Order of Saint Stanislaus (Russian)
Recipients of the Order of St. Vladimir
Samogitian Roman Catholics